Birwadi fort is hill fortress located in the village of Birwadi in Roha taluka, Raigad district, Maharashtra, India. Birwadi village is about 3 km away from Chanera village, which is on the Roha–Salav road. The fort looks like a small hillock from a distance.

How to reach
Birwadi fort is connected by road to the village Chanera. State buses and Rickshaw are available to reach Chanera from Roha. The way to the fort is from the back of the Newly constructed Devi temple. It takes about 45 minutes to reach the top of the fort.

History
In 1648, this fort was built by Shivaji Maharaj,  along with Lingana fort, after capturing Kalyan. This fort was used to keep watch on the Revdanda creek and to check the activities of Siddhi.

Places to see
There are four corner bastions and the main gate in good condition. There are many stone cut water cisterns on the fort. Two cannons are now moved to the temple at the base of the fort. The view from the summit is pleasing with rice-fields and dense pockets of the jungle around.

Night halt
The night halt can either be made in the Govt. school in the village or in the Devi temple.

Gallery

See also 

 List of forts in Maharashtra
 List of forts in India
 Marathi People
 Maratha Navy
 List of Maratha dynasties and states
 Maratha War of Independence
 Battles involving the Maratha Empire
 Maratha Army
 Maratha titles
 Military history of India
 List of people involved in the Maratha Empire

References 

Buildings and structures of the Maratha Empire
Forts in Raigad district
16th-century forts in India
Hiking trails in India

Hiking